Sung Siew Secondary School is a single-session secondary school located in the town of Sandakan, state of Sabah, East Malaysia. It is located at the foot of Trig Hill which is 2 kilometres away from Sandakan town centre. The school was established in 1907, making it one of the oldest schools in Sandakan.

The current principal of the school is Mr Kwok Chee Yen, who has occupied the post since 2020. There are around 75 staffs and 1500 students in the school. The school is also recognised as one of the leading secondary schools in the state.

History

Sung Siew Secondary School is a part of the Basel Christian Church of Malaysia. The development of Basel Church schools was inspired by foreign settlers to provide education to their children.

Sung Siew has its origin in the year 1907, it was founded by the late Rev. Yap Hyen Moo, who was commissioned by the Basel Mission's Church at West Point in Hong Kong who was to be stationed in Sandakan as the first catechist school teacher. At first it was purely a Chinese-medium school and was firstly known as the Basel Mission School of Elopura, Sandakan. In 1910, a German pastor, Rev. Shie came from the Basel Mission in Basel, Switzerland and started the English section. He became the first principal. Since then, the school became known as ‘Sung Siew’ which means ‘Double Education (English and Chinese Language).’ Among a number of efficient and dedicated teachers at that time was the late Mr. Chung Yuk Fong (who was at one time the President of the Basel Christian Church of Malaysia in Sabah), who was well known for his dedication as a long-serving teacher in that.

In 1914, the First World War broke out and as a consequence, the English section of Sung Siew was compelled to close, but the Chinese section remain unaffected. During the ensuing three years after the first World War which ended in 1918, the school had financial and personnel difficulties and therefore the English section was not reopened until 1923.

At the end of 1941, the Japanese army arrived and occupied North Borneo and Sung Siew was compelled to close for the second time. It reopened in 1946/1947, firstly with the Chinese section and later the English section. The church and school suffered greatly during World War II. Leaders were killed and property was extensively destroyed and burnt. The school was faced with total rebuilding problems after the war. The only church property that was not destroyed during the World War II was an old rectory built by the Basel mission. This old building was later renovated for occupation by an American Lutheran missionary. In 1949 a double-storey wooden building costing about RM 16,000.00 was built with the aid of an outright donation of US$ 2,000.00 from the then Director of the Lutheran World Federation in Hong Kong, the late pastor Arthur S. Olson, and a single generous donation of RM2,000.00 from a member of the church, the late Mr. Wong Tet Siew.

Current and former principals

Facilities and buildings

Grand Stage and Grand Stand

Senior block students and teachers gathered at the Grand Stand every Monday for assembly. As for junior block students, assemblies were held on every Tuesday also at the Grand Stand. However, both junior and senior students gathered at the Grand Stand during any school-level celebrations. Among the events that are held at the school's Grand Stage during school-level celebrations which includes Hari Raya Aidilfitri, National Day, Teacher's Day, Chinese New Year, Easter Celebrations, Harvest Festival and also the school's annual Speech and Awards Day.

Senior block

The school comprises two main sections: senior block and junior block. The senior block includes the basketball court, reading hall and the theatre building. Class 3E and 3F, Form 4, Form 5 classrooms are located in the senior block. The senior block is occupied with a total of five laboratories; Physics Laboratory, Biology Laboratory, Chemistry Laboratory, Science Laboratory I and Science Laboratory II (not to be confused with Junior Laboratory) along with a library, Kemahiran Hidup (Living Skills) workshop, Computer Laboratory and the Mini Theatre.

Physics Laboratory, Biology Laboratory, Chemistry Laboratory, library and all senior block classrooms are located at the U-shaped building whereas two Science Laboratories, Computer Laboratory and the Mini Theatre are located at the theatre building which is situated above the school's Canteen A. Government examinations such as PT3 were held at Junior Block, whilst SPM were held at the U-shaped building of senior block.

Junior block

Separated from Senior Block, Junior Block is located across the road, linked to Senior Block with the Skybridge. Junior Block houses classrooms for Bridge Class, Form 1, Form 2 and Form 3 students together with a staffroom, Junior Laboratory and Canteen B. The latter building was for Sung Siew Primary School until 2005 as the primary school was relocated to a new location in Taman Indah Jaya, Mile 4.

The assemblies of junior students are held at the Grand Stage at Senior Block, instead of the Atrium. However, Form 3 students that reside at Junior Block, are required to gather for Monday assemblies, not Tuesday assemblies.

Official website
Before the current website, there have been numerous ideas for the school's official website for as early as the year 1998. Previous school website projects including the one in 2004 (searched by the Wayback Machine) did not stand for long as generations of students are graduated each year.

In November 2005, there was a website development started by a group of students led by the student Lee Yang Yang and teacher Ms Latifah Yusof in November 2005. After several months of development, the school's website was officially launched on 7 February 2006. The website featured school events and a photo gallery.

A new website development team was elected in July 2006 to succeed the pioneer team. The website development team for session 2006 and 2007 was led by Raymond Heng. The new Chief Website Designer for the year 2007/2008 was led by Cynthia Chee.

The school currently doesn't have a website.

References

Secondary schools in Malaysia
Educational institutions established in 1907
Schools in Sabah
Chinese-language schools in Malaysia